Ram Awtar Sharma  is an Indian politician. He was elected to the Lok Sabha, the lower house of the Parliament of India, from Gwalior in Madhya Pradesh, as a member of the Bharatiya Jana Sangh.

Sharma died at Gwalior on 29 October 1987 at the age of 80 years.

References

External links
Official biographical sketch in Lok Sabha website

India MPs 1967–1970
Lok Sabha members from Madhya Pradesh
1908 births
Bharatiya Jana Sangh politicians
1987 deaths
People from Gwalior
Bharatiya Janata Party politicians from Madhya Pradesh